Félix Pollaczek (1 December 1892 in Vienna – 29 April 1981 at Boulogne-Billancourt) was an Austrian-French engineer and mathematician, known for numerous contributions to  number theory, mathematical analysis, mathematical physics and probability theory. He is best known for the Pollaczek–Khinchine formula in queueing theory (1930), and the Pollaczek polynomials.

Pollaczek studied at the Technical University of Vienna, got a M.Sc. in electrical engineering from  Technical University of Brno (1920), and his Ph.D. in mathematics from University of Berlin (1922) with a dissertation titled Über die Kreiskörper der l-ten und l2-ten Einheitswurzeln, advised by Issai Schur and based on results published first in 1917.

He was employed by AEG in Berlin (1921–23), worked for Reichspost (1923–33). In 1933, he was fired because he was Jewish. He moved to Paris, where
he was consulting teletraffic engineer to various institutions from 1933 onwards.
In 1977 was awarded the John von Neumann Theory Prize, although his age prevented him from receiving the prize in person.
He was posthumously elected to the 2002 class of Fellows of the Institute for Operations Research and the Management Sciences.

He married mathematician Hilda Geiringer in 1921, and they had a child, Magda, in 1922. However, their marriage did not last, and Magda was brought up by Hilda.

Notes
Biography of Felix Pollaczek from the Institute for Operations Research and the Management Sciences

References

Austrian mathematicians
20th-century French mathematicians
Queueing theorists
Scientists from Vienna
Scientists from Paris
TU Wien alumni
Humboldt University of Berlin alumni
1892 births
1951 deaths
Austro-Hungarian mathematicians
Austro-Hungarian Jews
Austrian Jews
John von Neumann Theory Prize winners
Fellows of the Institute for Operations Research and the Management Sciences
Austrian emigrants to France